Leonardo Zarpellon (born 22 May 1999) is an Italian professional footballer who plays as a midfielder for  club Virtus Verona.

Club career
A youth product of Bassano, Zarpellon transferred to Vicenza in the summer of 2018. Zarpellon made his professional debut with Vicenza in a 0–0 Serie C tie with Giana Erminio on 16 September 2018. On 20 September 2020, Zarpellon extended his contract with Vicenza until 2023, and went on a season-long loan to Virtus Verona. On 27 August 2021, he returned to Virtus Verona on another season-long loan.

References

External links
 
 

1999 births
Living people
People from Bassano del Grappa
Italian footballers
Association football midfielders
Serie C players
Bassano Virtus 55 S.T. players
L.R. Vicenza players
Virtus Verona players
Sportspeople from the Province of Vicenza
Footballers from Veneto